The Masefau Defensive Fortifications consist of a pair of concrete pillboxes on the shores of Masefau Bay on the island of Tutuila in the United States territory of American Samoa.  These octagonal structures differ from others found in western Tutuila in that they have no separate interior space for the storage of ammunition.  The structures were exposed by a typhoon in 2009.

The site was listed on the National Register of Historic Places in 2012.

See also
National Register of Historic Places listings in American Samoa

References

Tutuila
United States Marine Corps installations
Buildings and structures on the National Register of Historic Places in American Samoa
Military installations established in 1940
Military installations closed in the 1940s
World War II on the National Register of Historic Places
1940 establishments in American Samoa